The lowlands bar-lipped skink (Eremiascincus pardalis) is a species of skink found in Queensland in Australia.

References

Eremiascincus
Reptiles described in 1877
Taxa named by William John Macleay